The Parmalat Cup was a football tournament for clubs that was played five times in the 1990s.

It was first held in 1993, and ran for four consecutive years, before a final edition took place in 1998.

The first event was hosted in Parma and won by Peñarol, who were to win two more editions, including the 1998 tournament held in Uruguay. The following events, were hosted in a variety of countries including United States, Brazil and Mexico.

Winners

Summaries

Titles by club

Participation by club

References

International club association football competitions in North America